Eau Claire is a borough in Butler County, Pennsylvania, United States. The population was 316 at the 2010 census. The name means "Clear Water" in French, and the name is pronounced as though it were spelled "U'Clare".

Geography
Eau Claire is located in northern Butler County at  (41.135335, -79.797914). It is bordered by the borough of Cherry Valley to the north. Pennsylvania Routes 38 and 58 intersect in the center of the borough. Route 38 leads north and east  to Emlenton on the Allegheny River and south  to Butler, the county seat, while Route 58 leads east  to Foxburg on the Allegheny River and west  to Grove City.

Demographics

As of the census of 2000, there were 355 people, 135 households, and 105 families residing in the borough. The population density was 258.4 people per square mile (100.0/km2). There were 143 housing units at an average density of 104.1 per square mile (40.3/km2). The racial makeup of the borough was 99.44% White, 0.28% African American and 0.28% Asian.

There were 135 households, out of which 35.6% had children under the age of 18 living with them, 59.3% were married couples living together, 12.6% had a female householder with no husband present, and 22.2% were non-families. 17.8% of all households were made up of individuals, and 6.7% had someone living alone who was 65 years of age or older. The average household size was 2.63 and the average family size was 2.90.

In the borough the population was spread out, with 26.5% under the age of 18, 9.9% from 18 to 24, 32.7% from 25 to 44, 20.8% from 45 to 64, and 10.1% who were 65 years of age or older. The median age was 33 years. For every 100 females, there were 98.3 males. For every 100 females age 18 and over, there were 96.2 males.

The median income for a household in the borough was $31,181, and the median income for a family was $32,083. Males had a median income of $29,125 versus $19,500 for females. The per capita income for the borough was $14,383. About 16.1% of families and 15.3% of the population were below the poverty line, including 22.0% of those under age 18 and 18.5% of those age 65 or over.

References

Populated places established in 1848
Pittsburgh metropolitan area
Boroughs in Butler County, Pennsylvania
1900 establishments in Pennsylvania